The mdx mouse is a popular model for studying Duchenne muscular dystrophy (DMD). The mdx mouse has a point mutation in its DMD gene, changing the amino acid coding for a glutamine to STOP codon. This causes the muscle cells to produce a small, nonfunctional dystrophin protein. As a result, the mouse has a mild form of DMD where there is increased muscle damage and weakness.

References 

Laboratory mouse strains
Muscular dystrophy